Dasyam Pranay Bhasker (born 6 July 1956) was an Indian politician, Minister and Member of Andhra Pradesh Legislative Assembly (MLA) for Hanamkonda (Assembly constituency), representing the Telugu Desam Party.

Early life 

Dasyam Pranay Bhasker was born on 6 July 1956 in Parkal, Warangal District.

Political career 
In 1989 AP Assembly elections Dasyam Pranay Bhasker contested from Hanamkonda Assembly representing TDP party and lost to P. V. Ranga Rao of INC, but 1994 Assembly elections re-contested in Hanamkonda Assembly Constituency and was elected defeating INC's P.V. Ranga Rao. and served as Minister of State for Sports, Youth Services, Youth Welfare, NCC Self Employment in N.T. Rama Rao cabinet.

Telangana Movement
Dasyam Pranay Bhasker was very much active and part of the then separate Telangana Movement. After pro term Speaker K. Jana Reddy announced the unanimous election of Chary as the Speaker, leaders of all political parties conducted him to the Chair. Speaking first on the occasion, Chandrasekhar Rao reminded the House that in the late ’90s, the mere mention of Telangana by late Dasyam Pranay Bhaskar had been removed from the records and the member was chided by the then Speaker.

References 

1956 births
People from Telangana
Telugu politicians
Telugu Desam Party politicians
Andhra Pradesh MLAs 1989–1994
1999 deaths